Natoma may refer to:

 Natoma (opera), a 1911 opera with music by Victor Herbert and libretto by Joseph D. Redding
 USC&GS Natoma, a private motorboat briefly serving as USS Natoma (SP-666) in the United States Navy, 1917–1919
 USS Natoma Bay (CVE-62), an escort carrier in the United States Navy, 1943–1946 
 Intel 440FX, a computer chipset

Places
 Natoma, Kansas, United States

California
 Lake Natoma
 Natoma, a populated place now part of Folsom, California that served as headquarters of the Natoma Company
 Natomas, Sacramento, California
 Natomas High School
 Natomas Unified School District
 Natomas Men's Professional Tennis Tournament